John Frederick Freeman (29 January 1880 – 23 September 1929) was an English poet and essayist, who gave up a successful career in insurance to write full-time.

He was born in London, and started as an office boy aged 13. He was a close friend of Walter de la Mare from 1907, who lobbied hard with Edward Marsh to get Freeman into the Georgian Poetry series; with eventual success. De la Mare's biographer Theresa Whistler describes him as "tall, gangling, ugly, solemn, punctilious".

He won the Hawthornden Prize in 1920 with Poems 1909-1920. His Last Hours was set to music by Ivor Gurney.

Works
 Happy is England (1914)
 Presage of Victory (1916)
 Stone Trees (1916)
 The Moderns : Essays in Literary Criticism (1917). Essays on George Bernard Shaw, H. G. Wells, Thomas Hardy, Maurice Maeterlinck, Henry James, Joseph Conrad, Coventry Patmore, Francis Thompson, and Robert Bridges.
 Memories of Childhood and other Poems (1919)
 Poems 1909-1920 (1920)
 Music (1921)
 The Red Path, A Narrative, And The Wounded Bird (1921)
 The Grove and Other Poems (1925)
 Prince Absalom (1925)
 Collected Poems (1928)
 Last Poems (1930)

External links

 
 
 

1880 births
1929 deaths
English essayists
Place of death missing
Writers from London
British male essayists
English male poets
20th-century English poets
20th-century essayists
20th-century English male writers
English male non-fiction writers